Caudate (Latin for "tail") may refer to:

 Caudate nucleus
 Caudate leaf shape
 Caudate lobe of liver
 Cauda equina
 A salamander (which is any member of the order Caudata)